Marie Antoinette is a stage musical with music by Sylvester Levay and book and lyrics by Michael Kunze, the authors of Elisabeth, Mozart! and Rebecca. The Libretto was written in English and then translated into Japanese. The premiere took place on  November 1, 2006 in Tokyo, Japan at the Imperial Garden Theater. Tamiya Kuriyama directed the original production. After running in Tokyo, the show was performed in Fukuoka, Osaka before moving back to Tokyo from April 2007 through May 2007.

The German premiere took place on January 30, 2009 at the Musical Theater Bremen with Kuriyama directing once again.

Plot synopsis
Marie Antoinette tells the story of two parallel lives; that of the infamous Queen of France and that of Margrid Arnaud, a poor woman. Both are the same age, and both are pretty, but that's where the similarities end. While Margrid is roaming the streets of Paris in rags, Marie Antoinette dances and flirts at the Palais-Royal. The French Revolution changes all that. Margrid Arnaud rises and Marie Antoinette falls, and when the two women eventually meet two worlds collide and the drama unfolds.
The musical uses the events of the French Revolution as a spectacular backdrop to the fate of the unhappy Queen. Margrid Arnaud personifies the nemesis of the monarchy, eventually leading to the extinction of Marie Antoinette and her world.

Background
In an interview on his website, Kunze said that producers had offered to stage the show in German and English-speaking countries, but said that he wanted to have the Kuriyama production all over the world. His previous musicals were adapted for the country they were played in.
Kunze believes that the production MA is the best interpretation of one of his Libretti so far. He praised the director and the cast.

Since then a revised Version premiered in Seoul, Korea.

Songs

These songs are included in the production and are on the cast recording, which was released in March 2006.

Act I
Prologue (The Great Cagliostro)
All we feel is Hunger
Why she, why not I?
Look at her
Why don't they eat the Cake?
Blinded by a thousand Candles
Turn, Turn
A perfect Queen
I'm sorry
Gold out of Nothing at all
The Voice in my Heart
You've got to give them what they want
If
Doctor Guillotin's Machine
Parce Qu'elle est Autrichinne
The Voice in my Heart (Reprise)
God cares for All
All I do
Lovers´ bickering
I am the Best
Seven weird Ingredients
Some Day to remember

Act II
The Bells of Justice
France on Parade
Turn, turn (Reprise)
Woman of Paris!
Money's talking
The only thing I ever did right
Something's wrong
The Paris cut
Reign of Terror
The Flight to Varennes
Why can't I just be a Smith
Turn, turn (Reprise III)
Onward, Brothers!
Thank God, we're all mad
All I do (Reprise)
Taking the Boy
Off with her Head!
Her Time is up
Blood must flow for Liberty!
Freedom!

The cast recording also features three additional tracks:
Blinded By A Thousand Candles
The Voice in My Heart
Money's Talking

References

External links
The Author's (Michael Kunze's) Website (in German)

2006 musicals
Biographical musicals
Works about Marie Antoinette
Musicals by Michael Kunze
Musicals by Sylvester Levay